Pelecocera pergandei is a species of syrphid fly in the family Syrphidae.

References

Eristalinae
Diptera of North America
Hoverflies of North America
Articles created by Qbugbot
Insects described in 1884
Taxa named by Samuel Wendell Williston